Zhou Fohai (Hepburn: Shū Futsukai; May 29, 1897 – February 28, 1948) was a Chinese politician and the second-in-command of the Executive Yuan in Wang Jingwei's collaborationist Reorganized National Government of the Republic of China during the Second Sino-Japanese War.

Biography
Zhou was born in Hunan province, China, during the Qing dynasty, where his father was an official in the Qing administration. After the Xinhai Revolution, he was sent to Japan for studies, attending the Seventh Higher School Zoshikan (the predecessor of Kagoshima University), followed by Kyoto Imperial University. During his stay in Japan, he became attracted to Marxism, and on his return to China, became one of the founders of the Chinese Communist Party. He attended the First Congress in Shanghai in July 1921, but quit the Communist Party in 1924 to join the Kuomintang. He was assigned as a secretary to the Public Relations Department of the central government, but maintained strong ties with the party's leftist clique, headed by Wang Jingwei and Liao Zhongkai. He strongly opposed Chiang Kai-shek’s Northern Expedition and Chiang Kai-shek’s conduct of the Second Sino-Japanese War.

After Wang Jingwei broke ranks with the Kuomintang during World War II and established the collaborationist Reorganized National Government of the Republic of China, Zhou soon followed. Within the new government, Zhou became Vice President, Minister of Finance and had control over part of the Nanjing regime army. He was also Minister of Police (until 1941) and became Mayor of Shanghai after Chen Gongbo in 1944. He also maintained secret contacts with the Nationalists in Chongqing.

At the end of World War II, Zhou was captured and taken to Chongqing where he remained in custody for nearly a year. He was then sent to Nanjing in Jiangsu Province where he stood trial for treason due to his wartime roles. At his trial, Zhou argued that, "In the first half of the period when I participated in the Nanjing government, I attempted, by keeping in touch with the enemy, to turn things to the advantage of my country; in the latter half, I tried to turn them against the enemy by maintaining contact with my country [the Chongqing government]." Nonetheless, Zhou was sentenced to death but this was commuted to life imprisonment by Chiang Kai-shek, after his wife had interceded for him. He suffered from heart and stomach problems while in prison and died on February 28, 1948, aged 50.

References

Citations

Bibliography

External links
周佛海 with photo
 A traitor's love nest

1897 births
1948 deaths
Chinese anti-communists
Chinese collaborators with Imperial Japan
Chinese people who died in prison custody
Chinese prisoners sentenced to death
Delegates to the 1st National Congress of the Chinese Communist Party
Finance Ministers of the Republic of China
Former Marxists
Kagoshima University alumni
Kuomintang collaborators with Imperial Japan
Kyoto University alumni
Mayors of Shanghai
Members of the Kuomintang
Politicians from Huaihua
Prisoners sentenced to death by China
Prisoners who died in Chinese detention
Republic of China politicians from Hunan
Vice presidents of the Republic of China
World War II political leaders